Herberg for Hjemløse   is a 1914 Danish silent film directed by Lau Lauritzen Sr. The film stars Philip Bech and Torben Meyer.

Cast
Philip Bech - Forstanderen
Torben Meyer - Journalist
Franz Skondrup
Carl Schenstrøm
Oscar Nielsen

External links
Danish Film Institute

1914 films
Danish silent films
Films directed by Lau Lauritzen Sr.